The 2021–22 Adelaide Strikers season was the eleventh in the club's history. The team was coached by Jason Gillespie and captained by Travis Head, they competed in the BBL's 2021–22 season.

Standings

Regular season

Playoffs

Squad information
 Players with international caps are listed in bold.
 Ages are given as of the first match of the tournament, 5 December 2021

Notes

References

Adelaide Strikers seasons
2021–22 Australian cricket season